

Notable people with the surname "Kitchen" include

A
Anaru Kitchen (born 1984), New Zealand cricketer
Ann Kitchen, American politician
Ashley Kitchen (born 1988), English footballer

B
Bethuel Kitchen (1812–1895), American politician
Bill Kitchen (disambiguation), multiple people

C
Chris Kitchen (born 1966), British trade union leader
Curtis Kitchen (born 1964), basketball player

D
David Kitchen (born 1953), South African sailor
Denis Kitchen (born 1946), American cartoonist
Derek Kitchen (born 1988), American politician
Derwin Kitchen (born 1986), American basketball player

F
Frank Kitchen (born 1931), English rugby league footballer
Fred Kitchen (writer) (1890–1969), English writer
Fred Kitchen (entertainer) (1872–1951), English entertainer

G
Garry Kitchen (born 1955), American computer programmer
George Kitchen (1876–??), English footballer

H
Hobie Kitchen (1903–??), Canadian ice hockey player
Hubert Kitchen (1928–2020), Canadian politician

I
Ishmaa'ily Kitchen (born 1988), American football player

J
John Kitchen (disambiguation), multiple people
Joseph Kitchen (1890–1974), English footballer
Joseph A. Kitchen, American politician
Josh Kitchen (born 1975), Australian rules footballer
Julie Kitchen (born 1977), English kick boxer

K
Kenneth Kitchen (born 1932), English professor

L
Lauren Kitchen (born 1990), Australian cyclist

M
Martin Kitchen (born 1936), British-Canadian historian
Martin Kitchen (priest) (born 1947), English priest
Mervyn Kitchen (born 1940), English cricketer
Michael Kitchen (born 1948), English actor
Mike Kitchen (born 1956), Canadian ice hockey player and coach

P
Paddy Kitchen (1934–2005), English novelist
Paul Kitchen (born 1957), American singer-songwriter
Perry Kitchen (born 1992), American soccer player
Peter Kitchen (born 1954), English footballer

R
Robert Kitchen (born 1957), Canadian politician

T
Tella Kitchen (1902–1988), American artist
Terry Kitchen, American singer-songwriter
Thomas Edwin Kitchen (1852–1897), English-Canadian politician

W
Walter Kitchen (1912–1988), Canadian ice hockey player

See also
Kitchin, a page for people with the given surname "Kitchin"
Senator Kitchen (disambiguation), a disambiguation page for Senators surnamed "Kitchen"

English-language surnames